Stiracolpus ahiparanus, common name : the keeled screw shell,  is a species of small sea snail, a marine gastropod mollusc in the family Turritellidae.

Description
The shell grows to a length of 25 mm.

Distribution
This marine species is endemic to New Zealand.

References

 Powell A. W. B., New Zealand Mollusca, William Collins Publishers Ltd, Auckland, New Zealand 1979 
 

Turritellidae
Gastropods of New Zealand
Gastropods described in 1927